Wintersdorf is a former municipality in the district Altenburger Land, in Thuringia, Germany. Since 1 December 2007, it is part of the town Meuselwitz.

Former municipalities in Thuringia
Duchy of Saxe-Altenburg